EVE Burst Error is a 1995 visual novel adventure game developed by C's Ware, originally released as an erotic game. It was written and produced by Hiroyuki Kanno, with chiptune video game music composed by Ryu Umemoto.

Gameplay
The game features a branching narrative where two different  protagonists, one male and one female, provide different perspectives on the story. The game introduced a unique twist to the system by allowing the player to switch between both protagonists at any time during the game, instead of finishing one protagonist's scenario before playing the other. EVE Burst Error often requires the player to have both protagonists co-operate with each other at various points during the game.

Plot

Franchise
The game spawned multiple sequels, among them Eve: The Lost One (written by Kazuki Sakuraba), Eve: New Generation (written by Kotaro Uchikoshi) and Eve: Rebirth Terror (written by Kasa Sakaki, scenario writer for Tsuyokiss). A remake titled Eve: Burst Error R with upgraded graphics was released in Japan by Red Flagship's label El-Dia on April 28, 2016 for Windows and on October 25, 2018 on Nintendo Switch.

Reception
In Japan, EVE Burst Error gained massive popularity, enough to gain a console port and an overseas release, which were unusual for eroge. It came in first place in the 2000 results of Sega Saturn Magazine'''s reader poll, garnering an average score of 9.5014. In 2017, Famitsu readers voted EVE the 17th best adventure game of all time.Sega Saturn Magazine's three reviewers gave the game 8/10, 8/10 and 9/10. RPGFan has given the game three reviews, scoring it 92/100 in 2000, 91/100 in 2001, and 83/100 in 2012.

References

External linksEVE Burst Error'' at Mobygames

1995 video games
Adventure games
Eroge
MangaGamer games
Mystery video games
NEC PC-9801 games
Nintendo Switch games
Sega Saturn games
Video games developed in Japan
Video games featuring female protagonists
Video games scored by Ryu Umemoto
Visual novels
Windows games